The Cliff of Sin is a 1950 Italian melodrama film directed by Roberto Bianchi Montero and starring Gino Cervi, Margarete Genske and Delia Scala.

The film's sets were designed by the art director Alfredo Montori. It was initially distributed by regional independents before being given a second release by Minerva Film in 1951.

Plot 
Ischia. Stella, a fatal woman, joins Silvano, her old lover, who has been living isolated and alcoholic for some time in a hut on the island. To achieve her purpose, to seize her possessions, she does not hesitate to poison him. Immediately after she seduces Paolo, a young fisherman, and involves him in the trafficking of a gang of smugglers, so much so that he gives up on getting married to Anna, she promises to him.  Michele, the girl's brother, returns to the island just to make Paolo retrace her steps but he too yields to Stella's charm, becoming her lover and her accomplice in six trafficking of her. However, he is arrested and sentenced.  Having served his sentence, he discovers the woman with Paolo and the two begin to fight. It just so happens that she is the woman who falls into the sea and dies. The two men, free from temptation, can become friends again.

Cast
Gino Cervi as Silvano
Margarete Genske as Stella
Delia Scala as Anna
Otello Toso as Michele
Ermanno Randi as Paolo
Olga Solbelli as Maria
Amedeo Trilli
Gustavo Serena
Virginia Balestrieri
Leopoldo Valentini as Giovanni

References

External links
 

1950 films
1950s Italian-language films
Films directed by Roberto Bianchi Montero
Italian drama films
1950 drama films
Italian black-and-white films
1950s Italian films